Jonas Fransson (born February 20, 1980) is a Swedish professional ice hockey goaltender. He currently plays for Rögle BK in the Swedish HockeyAllsvenskan.

He was the backup goaltender with Linköpings HC, behind former IIHF goalie Daniel Henriksson.

Clubs
Tranås AIF (1997–2000)
HV 71 (2000–2001)
Leksands IF (2001
HV 71 (2001–2002
Leksands IF (2002)
IFK Arboga (2002–2003)
Rögle BK (2003–2005)
Linköpings HC (2005–2006)
Tranås AIF (2006–2007)
Linköping HC (2007–2009)
Stavanger Oilers (2009)
EfB Ishockey (2009–2010)
Rögle BK (2010–present)

References

External links

1989 births
Swedish ice hockey goaltenders
Rögle BK players
Living people